Living Goddess is a 2008 film that documents lives of three young Kumaris (prepubescent girls believed to be living goddesses) against the backdrop of the Nepalese Civil War. This film caused controversy at the time of its release, mostly due to the ritual sacrifice of 108 cows and goats recorded in detail during the opening scene.

Premiered at Silverdocs, the AFI/Discovery Channel Documentary Festival in Downtown Silver Spring.

External links

 

2008 films
British documentary films
Documentary films about Nepal
Documentary films about children
Documentary films about religion
Works about religion and children
Documentary films about children in war
Nepalese Civil War films
2000s English-language films
2000s British films